Perturbation (from Latin: perturbare "to confuse, disorder, disturb", from per- "through" + turbare "disturb, confuse," from turba "turmoil, crowd") is a set of pedology (soil study) and sedimentary geology processes relating to changes in the nature of water-borne alluvial sediments and in situ soil deposits over time.

 Pedoturbation (from Greek: πέδον (pédon), "soil") involves mixing between soil horizons, and is an important factor in soil formation. Pedoturbation includes churning clays, cryoturbation, and bioturbation. Types of bioturbation include faunal pedoturbation (animal burrowing), and floral pedoturbation (root growth, tree-uprootings). Pedoturbation transforms soils through destratification, mixing, and sorting, as well as creating preferential flow paths for soil gas and infiltrating water. The zone of active bioturbation is termed the soil biomantle.
 Soil perturbation that is not pedoturbation. Precipitation of surface salts also causes localized disruption of soils. Because it does not result in mixing between soil horizons, it is not considered pedoturbation.
 In geology, bioturbation is the displacement and mixing of sediment particles (i.e. sediment reworking) and solutes (i.e. biologically-mediated irrigation) by benthic zone (bottom water) fauna (animals) or flora (plants). Activity of bacteria is yet another important cause of perturbation in the geological record. Field termites are especially important in tropical climate regions within 15° of the equator.

See also
 Turbidite

References 

Sedimentology